Kendra Goodwin (born October 27, 1982) is an American former competitive ice dancer. Goodwin was adopted from Indonesia as an infant. She was raised in New Jersey, and lives in Randolph. She has competed with Paul Goldner, Chris Obzansky, and Brent Bommentre.

Goodwin competed with Obzansky on the junior level, winning the 2000 Junior Grand Prix event in China. They were the 2001 U.S. junior national silver medalists and placed 15th at the 2001 World Junior Figure Skating Championships. The partnership broke up due to Obzansky's choice to serve as a Mormon missionary. She teamed up with Brent Bommentre in the spring of 2003. They won the pewter medal at the 2004 U.S. Championships and competed at the 2004 Skate America and the 2004 Cup of Russia. Goodwin and Bommentre announced the end of their partnership on March 1, 2005. Goodwin announced on June 2, 2005 that she was reforming her partnership with Obzansky to compete in the 2005/2006 season.

Competitive highlights

With Bommentre

With Obzansky

With Cockrum

With Goldner

References

External links
 
 

1982 births
American female ice dancers
Living people
People from Randolph, New Jersey
American adoptees
American people of Javanese descent
American sportspeople of Indonesian descent
21st-century American women